Hyo-jin is a Korean unisex given name. Its meaning differs based on the hanja used to write each syllable of the name. There are 24 hanja with the reading "hyo" and 47 hanja with the reading "jin" on the South Korean government's official list of hanja which may be registered for use in given names.

People with this name include:

Entertainers
Gong Hyo-jin (born 1980), South Korean actress
Kim Hyo-jin (born 1981), stage name JeA, South Korean singer, member of girl group Brown Eyed Girls
Park Hyo-jin (born 1981), stage name Narsha, South Korean singer, member of girl group Brown Eyed Girls
Kim Hyo-jin (born 1984), South Korean actress 
Bang Hyo-jin (born 1988), stage name Go Eun-ah, South Korean actress
Ahn Hyo-jin (born 1991), stage name LE, South Korean female singer, member of girl group EXID

Sportspeople
Yu Hyo-jin (born 1981), South Korean male football midfielder (J2 League)
Choi Hyo-jin (born 1983), South Korean male football wingback (K League 1)
Yeo Hyo-Jin (born 1983), South Korean male football defender (K League 2)
Ku Hyo-jin (born 1985), South Korean female swimmer
Yang Hyo-jin (born 1989), South Korean female volleyball player
Lee Hyo-jin (born 1994), South Korean female handball player

Other
Hyo Jin Moon (1964–2008), eldest son of Unification Church founder Sun Myung Moon

See also
List of Korean given names

References

Korean unisex given names